The Gateway Grizzlies are a professional baseball team based in the St. Louis suburb of Sauget, Illinois, in the United States. The Grizzlies are a member of the West Division of the Frontier League, which is a partner league of Major League Baseball. The Grizzlies played their home games during their inaugural 2001 season at Sauget Field. In 2002, GCS Credit Union Ballpark (formerly GMC Stadium) opened and has remained the club's home since. GCS Credit Union Ballpark initially opened up to the public in time for the 2002 season for the Gateway Grizzlies. Some of the defining features of GCS Credit Union Ball park include lawn seats, bleacher seats, box seating, party suites, hot tub suite, and more.

Seasons

Current Roster

"Baseball's Best Burger" 
The team offers their own version of the Luther burger named "Baseball's Best Burger". Featured on ESPN, Fortune, and Man v. Food, the 1,000 calorie burger uses a deep-fried doughnut in place of a traditional bun.

Broadcasting 
Grizzlies games are currently broadcast on Mixlr, and can be watched live on FloSports with a subscription. The team's current director of Broadcasting and Media Relations is Jason Guerette.

Notable alumni
 Scott Patterson (2002–2005), a retired pitcher, had his contract purchased by the New York Yankees in 2006. Patterson was called up to the majors for one game in 2008 before being sent back down, and was claimed three months later by the San Diego Padres. Following that year, he played for 8 more seasons between various minor league and international teams. As a member of the 2011 United States National Baseball Team at the Pan American Games, Patterson won a silver medal. He later retired in 2016.
 Justin Erasmus (2013), pitcher, played in the Boston Red Sox organization and in the Australian Baseball League before joining the Grizzlies for the 2013 season. He went back to the AUBL afterwards, and is currently on the Canberra Cavalry. Erasmus was a member of the 2009 South Africa roster and the 2017 Australia roster in the World Baseball Classic.
 Trevor Richards (2015–2016), pitcher, was signed by the Miami Marlins in 2016, and called up to the majors in 2018. He has since pitched for the Tampa Bay Rays and Milwaukee Brewers, and is currently on the Toronto Blue Jays.

References

External links 
 
 FloSports streaming

Sports in the Metro East
Frontier League teams
Baseball teams established in 2001
Professional baseball teams in Illinois
2001 establishments in Illinois